Society of Friends of Science (Polish: Towarzystwo Przyjaciół Nauk, TPN) can refer to:
 Society of Friends of Science in Przemyśl
 Society of Friends of Science in Silesia
 Society of Friends of Science in Warsaw
 Society of Friends of Science in Wilno (Vilno)